In mathematics the Petersson inner product is an inner product defined on the space 
of entire modular forms. It was introduced by the German mathematician Hans Petersson.

Definition

Let  be the space of entire modular forms of weight  and 
 the space of cusp forms.

The mapping , 

is called Petersson inner product, where 

is a fundamental region of the modular group  and for  

is the hyperbolic volume form.

Properties

The integral is absolutely convergent and the Petersson inner product is a positive definite Hermitian form.

For the Hecke operators , and for forms  of level , we have:

This can be used to show that the space of cusp forms of level  has an orthonormal basis consisting of 
simultaneous eigenfunctions for the Hecke operators and the Fourier coefficients of these 
forms are all real.

References

 T.M. Apostol, Modular Functions and Dirichlet Series in Number Theory, Springer Verlag Berlin Heidelberg New York 1990, 
 M. Koecher, A. Krieg, Elliptische Funktionen und Modulformen, Springer Verlag Berlin Heidelberg New York 1998, 
 S. Lang, Introduction to Modular Forms, Springer Verlag Berlin Heidelberg New York 2001, 

Modular forms